Harold Dennis "Dickie" Bird,  (born 19 April 1933), is an English retired international cricket umpire. During his long umpiring career, he became a much-loved figure among players and viewing public, due to his excellence as an umpire, but also his many eccentricities.

Bird played first-class cricket for Yorkshire and Leicestershire as a right-handed batsman, but only scored two centuries in 93 appearances. His career was blighted by a knee injury, which eventually caused him to retire aged 31. He umpired in 66 Test matches (at the time a world record) and 69 One Day Internationals including 3 World Cup Finals.

In February 2014, Yorkshire announced that Bird was to be voted in as the club's president at their Annual General Meeting on 29 March.

Bird's autobiography, published in 1997, has sold more than a million copies.

Early life
Harold Dennis Bird was born at Church Lane, Barnsley, West Riding of Yorkshire, England, on Wednesday, 19 April 1933, but when he was two years old, he moved with his family to New Lodge estate as his house was pulled down in a slum clearance scheme. The son of a coal miner, he gained the nickname 'Dickie' at school. In 1944, Bird failed his 11-plus examination and went to Raley Secondary Modern School, leaving at the age of 15. For a while, he worked at a coal mine, but gave it up, deciding it was not for him. Instead, he set out for a career in sport.

Playing career
When a knee injury put paid to playing football professionally, he followed his second love, cricket. In his early career in Barnsley, he played club cricket in the same team as Geoff Boycott, and journalist and chat show host Michael Parkinson, who became a lifelong friend. In 1956, Bird signed up with his home county, Yorkshire. Boycott has spoken highly of Bird's ability as a batsman, but feels that his attempt to forge a career as a county cricketer was hampered by his inability to control his nerves – although he was also not helped by stiff competition for the opening batsman's position: indeed, the very match after scoring his first (and only) County Championship century of 181*, scored in the absence of the regular opener Ken Taylor (who was playing for England), he was dropped when Taylor returned from international duty. Bird played only five more championship matches that season (plus the MCC versus Champion County match), four in the middle order rather than his preferred opener's position, and spent most of the season as "twelfth man": hardly a situation conducive to building confidence in his batting. Shortly before the start of the 1960 season he moved to Leicestershire, where he enjoyed a more or less regular place in the team at first – scoring over 1000 runs in his first season of 1960, including a century against the touring South Africans, which would prove to be his only other first-class century – but latterly faded out of the team, thanks to a combination of loss of form, confidence and a recurrence of his persistent knee injury, playing his last match in 1964. Overall, between 1956 and 1964, Bird played first-class cricket as a batsman for Yorkshire and Leicestershire in 93 matches, mostly in the English County Championship.

After his county career ended Bird was a cricket professional for Paignton between 1965 and 1969, scoring over 10,000 runs. He coached cricket at Plymouth College between 1966 and 1968, and coached in Johannesburg in 1968 and 1969.

Umpiring career
He stood in his first county game in 1970. Three years later, he officiated at his first Test match, England v New Zealand at Headingley in Leeds. The other umpire was Charlie Eliott as England won by an innings and one run. Bird also umpired in the second and third tests of that summer's tour by the West Indies – both of which proved eventful: in the second test at Edgbaston, Bird had to umpire from the bowler's end at both ends for couple of overs, with a substitute umpire at square leg, when Arthur Fagg refused to continue in protest against the conduct of the West Indian players. Then, in the third test at Lords, play was interrupted by an IRA bomb scare (later found out to be a hoax). While the crowd cleared out of the ground in record time, Bird and the players sat down in the centre of the pitch, knowing there was no bomb there. He gained a reputation for stopping play for weather, and almost never giving batsmen out LBW – he gave LBWs so seldom that if he did give it, there was absolutely no doubt the batsman was out. Bird was also very strict on the definitions of "intimidatory bowling", both from short-pitched deliveries and high full tosses, and made it abundantly clear he would tolerate none of it.

Bird was an umpire in the final of the inaugural Cricket World Cup in 1975.  A pitch invasion followed the West Indies' 17-run victory, and number of players and umpires had items of their playing outfits "souvenired" by the crowd. A year later, Bird was a passenger on a bus in South London, when he noticed the conductor was wearing a white hat very similar to the one he favoured, and asked the conductor where he obtained it from."Man, haven't you heard of Mr Dickie Bird," he replied. "This is one of his hats. I took it off his head at the World Cup final... we all ran onto the field and I won the race."

Bird's attention to detail was placed under scrutiny at the Centenary Test between England and Australia at Lord's in 1980. Although the Saturday of this particular match had mostly pleasant sunshine, Bird and his fellow umpire, David Constant, refused to let play start because of the previous night's rain; parts of the outfield were still too waterlogged, according to the officials. Angry Marylebone Cricket Club (MCC) members scuffled with Constant as he and the team captains returned to the Long Room after their fifth pitch inspection. The two captains, Ian Botham and Greg Chappell, had to intervene to protect Constant. Bird, however, was still on the pitch at the time according to his own recounting of the event in his book. When play finally started at 3:45 pm, police had to escort the umpires through the Long Room and on to the field. This was not the only occasion in which Bird had to stop play, despite current sunny conditions, because of previous bad weather: in the 1988 Test at Headingley against the West Indies, an overnight rainstorm caused a blocked drain to overflow with a delayed action: the pitch was fine but the bowler's run-up was slowly flooding from underneath, the water level was oozing up over Curtly Ambrose's bootlaces, and Bird's as well when he went over to investigate, and the umpires had to take the players off while the outfield was cleared of water.

One of Bird's strengths was that he was able to manage and earn the respect of some of the more volatile players in the game, sometimes by using his infectious humour. He was also known as being eccentric, famously arriving at a ground five hours early as the Queen was to visit that day.

At the beginning of his final Test in 1996, the two teams – India and England – formed a "guard of honour" as he came out, and he received a standing ovation from the crowd. Bird, an emotional man, was in tears. His eyes had to clear quickly, though, because two minutes later he had to give England captain Mike Atherton out LBW in the first over. Two years later, in 1998, he stood in his last county match.

Bird umpired in 66 Test matches (at the time a world record) and 69 One Day Internationals including 3 World Cup Finals.

He came out of retirement in January 2007 to umpire in the XXXX Gold Beach Cricket Tri-Nations series involving cricketing legends from England, the West Indies and Australia, which partly took place at Scarborough Beach in Perth, Western Australia.

Post retirement
Bird went on to write his autobiography simply titled My Autobiography (with a foreword by Michael Parkinson), which sold more than a million copies. A sequel titled White Cap and Bails – Adventures of a Much Travelled Umpire was published in 1999 by Hodder and Stoughton. Bird set up the Dickie Bird Foundation to help disadvantaged under-18s achieve their potential in sport.

He was the subject of This Is Your Life in 1992 when he was surprised by Michael Aspel at Yorkshire Television.

Bird appeared in one episode of Trigger Happy TV. He also appeared in an episode of Top Gear in 2010. That year he also took part in BBC's The Young Ones, in which six celebrities in their seventies and eighties, attempted to overcome some of the problems of ageing, by harking back to the 1970s. He also made a guest appearance in Series 16 Ep 7 of Heartbeat umpiring a cricket match.

Bird was appointed Member of the Order of the British Empire (MBE) in 1986 and Officer of the Order of the British Empire (OBE) in the 2012 New Year Honours for services to cricket and charity. Bird has also received honorary doctorates from Huddersfield, Leeds and Sheffield Hallam Universities. Bird was awarded the Freedom of Barnsley in 2000. He was awarded Honorary Life Membership of the Marylebone Cricket Club in 1996.

A six-foot statue of Bird erected in his honour near the place of his birth in Barnsley was unveiled on 30 June 2009. It has subsequently been raised by putting it on a five-foot-high plinth in order to discourage late night revellers hanging inappropriate items on the famous finger.

On his pending appointment as President of Yorkshire CC in 2014, Bird stated "Never in my wildest dreams did I think that I would become the president of the greatest cricket club in the world".

In August 2014, Bird was one of 200 public figures who were signatories to a letter to The Guardian expressing their hope that Scotland would vote to remain part of the United Kingdom in September's referendum on that issue.

In March 2021, Bird spoke to the BBC about his loneliness while shielding during the COVID-19 lockdown. He said that exercise was the key to him keeping his spirits up.

Umpiring records

 , Bird has officiated the most test matches in a single nation – 54 in England and has officiated in more test matches at Lord's (15) than any other umpire.

References

External links

 The Dickie Bird Foundation
 Dickie Bird at Cricinfo
 IMDb.com Dickie Bird TV & Video appearances

1933 births
Living people
English cricketers
English Test cricket umpires
English One Day International cricket umpires
Leicestershire cricketers
Officers of the Order of the British Empire
Presidents of Yorkshire County Cricket Club
Cricketers from Barnsley
Yorkshire cricketers
English cricketers of 1946 to 1968
English cricketers of 1969 to 2000
English autobiographers